The rivière à la Loutre (English: Otter River) is a tributary of the Saguenay River, flowing in the municipality of Saint-Fulgence in the Le Fjord-du-Saguenay Regional County Municipality, in the administrative region of Saguenay-Lac-Saint-Jean, in Quebec, in Canada.

The route 172 (route de Tadoussac) crosses the river at
the Otter at its mouth. Rang Saint-Louis road (north–south direction)
serves the west side of this river.

Forestry is the sector's primary economic activity; second, recreational tourism activities.

The surface of Rivière à la Loutre is usually frozen from late November to early April, however safe traffic on the ice is generally from mid-December to late March.

Geography 
The main neighboring watersheds of the Rivière à la Loutre are:
 North side: Valin River, Saint-Louis River, Canada stream;
 East side: Lajoie stream, Outardes River, Moulin brook, Glissant brook, Pelletier River, rivière de la Descente des Femmes, Saguenay River, Sainte-Marguerite River;
 South side: Saguenay River;
 West side: Valin River, Caribou River, Shipshaw River.

The Rivière à la Loutre takes its source from a mountain stream.

From its source, at the confluence of two mountain streams, the course of the Rivière à la Loutre descends on  according to the following segments:
  south, to rang Sainte-Anne road;
  southwesterly, forming an easterly curve to Rang Sainte-Marie road;
  to the south in a deep valley, to a stream (coming from the west) corresponding to a bend in the river;
  towards the south-east at the foot of a mountain, delimiting the northern part of a small plain, to the mouth of the river.

The mouth of the Rivière à la Loutre flows onto the north shore of the Saguenay River in the municipality of Saint-Fulgence. This confluence of the Rivière à la Loutre is located at:
  east of the mouth of the Valin River;
  west of the center of the village of Saint-Fulgence;
  north-east of downtown Saguenay;
  west of the mouth of the Saguenay River.

From the mouth of the Rivière à la Loutre, the current follows the course of the Saguenay River eastwards to the height of Tadoussac where it meets the Saint Lawrence River.

Toponymy 
The toponym Rivière à la Loutre was formalized on December 5, 1968, at the Place Names Bank of the Commission de toponymie du Québec.

See also 

 List of rivers of Quebec

References 

Rivers of Saguenay–Lac-Saint-Jean
Le Fjord-du-Saguenay Regional County Municipality